Hey Duggee is a British animated educational preschool television series aimed at two to five year olds. Created by Grant Orchard, it is produced by Studio AKA, in association with BBC Studios (formerly BBC Worldwide). The show is narrated by Alexander Armstrong.

The programme's characters are talking anthropomorphic animals, with Duggee communicating in woofs. The episodes are based around The Squirrel Club, an activity club for children that Duggee leads. The childrenthe club's Squirrelstake part in all kinds of activities, have adventures and earn badges for their accomplishments. Each episode shows the Squirrels completing an activity or adventure relating to a badge that they earn at the end of each episode. There is no set formula for every episode, with many referencing or parodying pop culture.

Hey Duggee has four series. It was first shown in December 2014. BBC and Studio AKA produced a second series in early 2016, with the first episode airing in the United Kingdom on 26 September 2016. A third series was commissioned in October 2017, with the first episode due to be broadcast in Autumn 2018, but was pushed back to 4 March 2019. It aired until September 2021 with a Christmas episode shown in December 2020. The third series received increased acclaim and popularity amongst children and adults alike during the 2020 pandemic lockdowns. It has been renewed for a fourth series on 5 September 2022.

Production 
The programme is animated using the computer program Flash, with a minimalist style using filled shapes with no outlines, and only effects that Flash is capable of, and only the Duggee character regularly uses gradients. For example, if there is a frog character, then it usually bears the appearance of a plain green triangle.

The production team consists of around 16 in-house animators, with six to eight scriptwriters.

Characters

Main 
 Narrator – the narrator of the show.
 Duggee – a friendly big brown male dog and the leader of the Squirrel club.
 Betty – a talkative and intelligent purple octopus.
 Norrie – a sweet-natured and curious brown mouse.
 Roly – an enthusiastic, loud and hyperactive grey hippo.
 Tag – a gentle, clumsy blue rhino.
 Happy – a tall, easy-going green crocodile, with a love of water and splashing in puddles.

Recurring 
Sander Jones as: 
 Enid – Duggee's pet cat.
 The Rabbits – live in the field near the clubhouse and all sound like hippies, apart from one who speaks French.
 Diesel – an angry bull who often chases Duggee and the Squirrels.
 Frog

Phillip Warner as:
 Naughty Monkey – a monkey who loves to cause chaos.
 King Tiger – local royalty whose favourite entertainment is the "jelly-belly dancers".
 The Chickens – live in the hen-house and enjoy watching episodes of a Spanish hospital-drama.
 Ladybird

Grant Orchard as:
 Naughty Mice – a gang of three trouble-making mice styled like a 1950s biker gang; they usually leave the scene with the phrase "Let's bounce".
 Whooooo – a shamanistic owl.
 Mole – a short-sighted animal who has dreams of being a stunt-mole.
 The Rabbits

Adam Longworth as:
 Lord Fingal of Skye Castle – a Scottish Terrier with a Scottish accent and a kilt.
 Tino the Artistic Mouse – a perfectionist mouse whom Roly describes as grumpy.
 Hedgley – a hedgehog who has an African-American accent.
 Mr. (John) Crab – a dramatic orange crab, married to a non-speaking crab named Nigel.
 Eugene – an anxious chipmunk involved in leading various theatrical events.
 Wilburt the Delivery Chipmunk – a postman who has difficulty pronouncing names.
 Thora and Agnes, the two old deer.
 Penguins

Lucy Montgomery as:
 Hennie – a tall, sports-loving ostrich.
 Chew Chew the Panda – a confectionery-loving panda.
 Fox

Morgana Robinson as:
 Katarina the Flamingo – the lead swimmer of a synchronised swimming team.
 Buggee – a small insect who feels useless due to her small size until the Squirrels show her otherwise.
 Peggee – a wildebeest who leads the Hummingbirds Club.
Masami Eagar as:

 Hatsu

Anelisa Lamola as:

 Mrs. Weaver

Tim Digby-Bell as:

 Mr. (Nigel) Crab – Mr. Crab's husband.

Other characters 
 The Hummingbirds – The other group of older animals in the episode The Making Friends Badge, with their very own version of Duggee. They are:
 Finbar (10 years old) (voiced by Charley Orchard in "The Making Friends Badge" and Ferris Hicks-Little-Jones in "The Same Badge")
 Merry (10 years old) (voiced by Charley Orchard in "The Making Friends Badge" and Avalon McNamara in "The Same Badge")
 Chad (9 years old) (voiced by Bastian Varrall in "The Making Friends Badge" and Bram Hicks-Little-Jones in "The Same Badge")
 Rochelle (11 years old) (voiced by Poppy Green in "The Making Friends Badge" and Mio Eagar in "The Same Badge")
 Ottie (12 years old) (voiced by Sean Orchard in "The Making Friends Badge" and Magdalena Beardsmore in "The Same Badge")
 Duglee – Duggee's little nephew, voiced by Poppy Green and Charley Orchard.
 Ethel the elephant

Merchandise and licensing deals 
In the UK, the BBC Children's Books imprint published books based on the series.

Golden Bear Toys manufactures Hey Duggee toys sold in the UK.

In 2015, Hey Duggee was adapted into several videogame apps for mobile devices. These include:
 The Big Badge App
 The Big Outdoors App
 We Love Animals
 Colouring
 Jigsaw Puzzles
 The Counting Badge
 The Exploring App
 The Squirrels Club
 The Christmas Badge

As of May 2015, Jasnor holds the master toy licence in Australia and New Zealand.

"The Stick Song"
"The Stick Song" premiered in the series 2 episode, Hey Duggee: The Stick Badge, which was first broadcast in the UK on 7 December 2017. Duggee and the Squirrels are making a campfire when Roly discovers one of his sticks can talk. The stick turns out to be a stick insect, and starts singing "stick" repeatedly to a catchy dance tune.

As of 2020, the song has been viewed over 7 million times on YouTube. The track has been featured on BBC Radio 6 Music and BBC Two's Newsnight. Many remixes have been produced, by both the BBC and others, including a heavy metal remix by children's heavy metal band Slay Duggee.

Episodes

Series overview

Pilot (2013)

Series 1 (2014-2015)

Series 2 (2016-2018)

Series 3 (2019-2021)
This series aired episodes every day at 12:00 pm on the CBeebies channel instead of on the morning block. It was the first to feature new voice actors included in the episode particle. There was also a new theme song.

Series 4 (2022-present)

Reception 
Stuart Heritage, writing in The Guardian, described the series as being "peerless." 

On Twitter, the London Fire Brigade (LFB) in Greenwich complained about "The Dressing-Up Badge". In the episode, Roly dresses up as a firefighter, but is described as being a fireman, which Greenwich LFB described as being outdated whereas the term firefighter is "the preferred respectful, inclusive, non-sexist, non-gendered term that should be being widely used by all media but especially the BBC".

Awards and nominations

References

External links 
 
 
 Hey Duggee at Studio AKA
 
 Page from Studio AKA

BBC children's television shows
English-language television shows
British children's animated adventure television series
British children's animated comedy television series
Animated preschool education television series
2014 British television series debuts
2010s British children's television series
2020s British children's television series
British flash animated television series
British preschool education television series
2010s British animated television series
2020s British animated television series
2010s preschool education television series
2020s preschool education television series
Nick Jr. original programming
Animated television series about dogs
Animated television series about children
CBeebies
Television series by BBC Studios